Clathrus chrysomycelinus is a species of fungus in the stinkhorn family. It is found in South America and reported from New Zealand, although the equivalence of the species is yet to be determined.

References

Phallales
Fungi of South America
Fungi described in 1898